Lois Wickstrom (born August 14, 1948) is a children's author, playwright and scriptwriter. Wickstrom is known for the "Nessie" books written with Jean Lorrah.

Amanda Mysteries

 The Amanda Mini-Mysteries by Lois June Wickstrom and Jack Kershner (2008)

Nessie Books

 Nessie and The Living Stone (2001)
 Nessie and the Viking Gold (2003)

Non-series books

 Oliver (1991)
 Ladybugs for Loretta (1978)
 Wendell, The Bully (Kindle Edition - Sep 25, 2003)
 The Reluctant Spy (Paperback - 2006)

External links 
 philadelphia weekly
 fantasticfiction
 nippon

20th-century American novelists
21st-century American novelists
American women novelists
Living people
1948 births
20th-century American women writers
21st-century American women writers